Ebrahimabad-e Hajji (also Romanized as Ebrāhīmābād-e Ḩājjī; also known as Ebrāhīmābād, Qodratābād, and Qudratābād) is a village in Azadegan Rural District, in the Central District of Rafsanjan County, Kerman Province, Iran. At the 2006 census, its population was 359, in 90 families.

References 

Populated places in Rafsanjan County